is a compilation album by Japanese entertainer Akina Nakamori, released through Universal Music Japan on December 3, 2014. The album combines Nakamori's 2014 compilations All Time Best: Original and All Time Best: Utahime Cover into a four-disc compilation.

Track listing

References

External links
 
 
 

2014 compilation albums
Akina Nakamori compilation albums
Japanese-language compilation albums
Universal Music Japan compilation albums